The Rabbit Hutch is a 2022 debut novel by writer Tess Gunty and winner of the 2022 National Book Award for Fiction. Gunty won the inaugural Waterstones Debut Fiction Prize and the Barnes & Noble Discover Prize for the novel.

Writing and development
The novel includes the perspectives of multiple characters. Gunty credits the novel The Quick and the Dead by Joy Williams as the "novel that began" The Rabbit Hutch, as it was the first in a series of unrelated "polyphonic" novels that Gunty read.

Reception
The Rabbit Hutch was well received by critics, included starred reviews from Booklist, Kirkus Reviews, Library Journal, and Publishers Weekly.

Library Journal called the novel a "woefully beautiful tale of a community striving for rebirth and redemption," while Kirkus referred to it as a "stunning and original debut that is as smart as it is entertaining." The Wall Street Journal's Sam Sacks said The Rabbit Hutch was "most promising first novel I’ve read this year." The Irish Times called it "breathtaking, compassionate and spectacular."

Multiple reviewers commented on Gunty's writing skill. Publishers Weekly said Gunty "mak[es] powerful use of language along the way." Booklist expanded on the sentiment, writing, "The brilliantly imaginative novel begins on an absurdist note before settling down to an offbeat, slightly skewed realism. Gunty is a wonderful writer, a master of the artful phrase." The Boston Globe highlighted how "Gunty weaves [characters'] stories together with skill and subtlety. The details ... are slipped in via a very few well-chosen details." The Times said, "The writing is incandescent, the range of styles and voices remarkable ... The novel leaps with great confidence across a multitude of styles."

Booklist highlighted Gunty's character development, saying the "fully realized characters come alive on the page, capturing the reader and not letting go."

The New York Times Book Review noted that there are "many bold moves in Gunty’s dense, prismatic and often mesmerizing debut, a novel of impressive scope and specificity that falters mostly when it works too hard to wedge its storytelling into some broader notion of Big Ideas." They added, "its excesses also feel generous: defiant in the face of death, metaphysical exits or whatever comes next." The Guardian shared the sentiment, indicating that the novel "is almost over-blessed with ideas. Gunty doesn’t quite balance the pieces of her story – she has a winning impulse for digression, but ... never quite settles into her sidebars. The insistent nudges back to the main arc stop her novel from creating the sense of invisible clockwork that would make it perfectly satisfying."

Publishers Weekly ultimately named The Rabbit Hutch one of the top ten books of 2022, regardless of genre.

Adaptation
The rights to produce a television show based on the novel were sold in November 2022.

References

2022 American novels
Alfred A. Knopf books
Novels set in Indiana
2022 debut novels
National Book Award for Fiction winning works